Elections to Purbeck District Council were held on 2 May 2002. One third of the council was up for election and the Conservative Party stayed in overall control of the council.

After the election, the composition of the council was
Conservative 16
Independent 4
Liberal Democrat 4

Election result

One Independent candidate was unopposed.

Ward results

References
2002 Purbeck election result
 Ward results

2002
2002 English local elections
2000s in Dorset